Wilsons Branch is a stream in Warren County in the U.S. state of Missouri. It is a tributary of Little Lost Creek.

Wilsons Branch has the name of George Wilson, Sr., the original owner of the site.

See also
List of rivers of Missouri

References

Rivers of Warren County, Missouri
Rivers of Missouri